Vladimir Polyakov (born 9 August 1935) is a Soviet athlete. He competed in the men's high jump at the 1956 Summer Olympics.

References

1935 births
Living people
Athletes (track and field) at the 1956 Summer Olympics
Soviet male high jumpers
Olympic athletes of the Soviet Union
Place of birth missing (living people)